Kondoa may refer to:

Kondoa Mjini, a ward in Tanzania
Kondoa District, in Tanzania
Kondoa (gastropod), a genus of land snails
Kondoa (fungus), the type genus of the Kondoaceae family